The Tar-Aiym Krang (1972) is a science fiction novel by American writer Alan Dean Foster. It is Foster’s first published novel and started both his Humanx Commonwealth universe and his two most popular recurring characters, Pip and Philip Lynx ("Flinx"). The book is second chronologically in the Pip and Flinx series.

The story follows Flinx, an orphan and a thief, as he steals a starmap from a dead body, that leads to a strange alien artifact on an abandoned world. This simple, chance adventure is the beginning of Flinx’s quest to discover the identities of his parents and the source of his strange mental abilities.

In popular culture
The members of Pink and Brown and Brian Gibson of Lightning Bolt formed a side project called Tar-Aiym Krang.

References

External links

Alan Dean Foster homepage

1972 American novels
American science fiction novels
Humanx Commonwealth
Novels by Alan Dean Foster
1972 science fiction novels
Novels about orphans
Ballantine Books books
1972 debut novels